Eastern Athletic Association Football Team Limited, also known as Eastern Sports Club, is a Hong Kong professional sports club whose football section competes in the Hong Kong Premier League, the top flight of Hong Kong football.

The football team is known as Eastern Football Team (currently known for sponsorship reasons as Eastern Long Lions Football Team and plays in the Hong Kong Premier League.

In 2017, Eastern became the first club from Hong Kong to compete in the group stage of AFC Champions League.

History

Early history
Two years later in 1927, the club changed its name to the Eastern Athletic Association, establishing itself as an all Chinese football club, and entered the Hong Kong Second Division.

During the 1931–32 season, Eastern initially won the right to promotion but declined. It was not until the 1936–37 season that the club would make its debut in the Hong Kong First Division, finishing 11th.

1940–1990
Eastern won its first trophy in club history in 1940, capturing the Senior Shield in a 2–1 victory over South China. Success was not permanent at Eastern who were relegated back to the Second Division not long after and did not return until the 1948–49 season.

The 1950s saw the first period of sustained success for Eastern. The club won the First Division for the first time in 1955–56 and captured two Senior Shields during this decade. It was also during the 50s when Hong Kong football legend Lam Sheung Yee signed with Eastern and earned his debut in the First Division. Lam would go on to spend four separate spells at Eastern throughout his career although silverware eluded Lam during those years.

During the 1960s and 70s, the majority of Eastern's funding came from pro-Taiwan backed groups while rivals Happy Valley received sponsorship from pro-China groups. An intense rivalry developed between the clubs during this period and the media referred to the derbies between them as the "Chinese Civil War."

In the 1981–82 season the club was managed by former England captain and World Cup winner Bobby Moore. Notable English players such as 1966 World Cup winner Alan Ball and Graham Paddon played for the club in the early 80s. Eastern's ability to attract such players was due to their large budget, funded by billionaire businessman Peter Lam. The strong squad were able to win two Senior Shields and a Hong Kong FA Cup in the 80s, however, they were never able to capture the First Division title.

Eastern Dynasty
Following the 1990–91 season, third placed club Lai Sun announced that they would be withdrawing from the First Division. This became the catalyst for Eastern's dynasty in the first half of the 90s as many former Lai Sun players found a home at Eastern. Starting with a runners up finish in 1991–92, the club then dominated Hong Kong football, winning three consecutive First Division titles between 1992 and 1995. During the 1993–94 and 1994–95 seasons, the club won the treble, capturing all three major trophies in both seasons.

Unfortunately, due to a massive reduction in sponsorship revenue prior to the 1995–96 season, Eastern had to release many of their top players and were forced to sign younger, less experienced players. A year later, the club were relegated after a last place finish and returned to the Second Division for the first time since 1948.

Relegation and subsequent promotion
In the subsequent ten years following relegation in 1997, Eastern struggled in the league. The club finished at the bottom of the Second Division in 2002–03 and dropped down to the Third Division. They would eventually turn the tide by capturing the Third Division title in 2004–05 and returned to the second tier.

Ahead of the 2006–07 season Eastern were to be demoted to Hong Kong Third Division but the Hong Kong Football Association intervened and invited the club to compete in First Division League for 2007–08 season. It looked unlikely at first that for the club to obtain sufficient sponsorship to make the move up, however the club confirmed their participation in July 2007.

After competing in the top flight for two seasons, Eastern decided to drop into the Third Division ahead of the 2009–10 season due to financial difficulties. After declining the right to promotion twice during their stay in the Third Division, the club finally accepted promotion during the 2011–12 season in which they won all 18 of their league matches and finished as champions.

During the 2012–13 season, Eastern was promoted back to the First Division League as the third place finishers in the Second Division League. They were branded as Eastern Salon from 2012 to 2016 for sponsorship reasons.

In April 2016, Eastern won the 2015–16 Hong Kong Premier League under the guidance of Chan Yuen Ting, becoming the first men's professional association football team to win a domestic, top flight championship under the management of a woman. Eastern lost only one game in the 2015–16 season under Chan.

In the 2016–17 season, Eastern was branded as Eastern Long Lions for sponsorship reasons. They beat Kitchee 3–1 to win the Community Cup. The club also reached the final of the Senior Shield before losing to Kitchee 2–1 at Hong Kong Stadium. The club went on a season-long unbeaten run in the league until the final match day when they lost to Kitchee 4–1 at Mong Kok Stadium and finished runners up. The season also marked the first time for a Hong Kong club to compete in the group stage of AFC Champions League. Eastern finished the ACL campaign with one point in six matches, finishing in the bottom of their group. The club's only silverware of the season came from the league playoff, where they beat Southern 3–0 in the final to secure their spot in the second qualifying round of the AFC Champions League the next year.

In 2018, Eastern obtained the sponsorship of Top East Holdings, allowing the club to expand its budget. The club launched a program known as Project E in which Eastern will send its most promising young players to train with Portuguese club Cova da Piedade.

Ahead of the 2019–20 season, Eastern lured reigning Coach of the Year Lee Chi Kin and many of his former players from Tai Po in hopes of returning the club to title contender status. The club were successful in his first season, winning the Senior Shield-FA Cup double, and won the Sapling Cup in his second season. But, the club failed to win the league in 2020–21, and Lee stepped down as head coach following the season.

Name history 
1932–2012: Eastern (東方)
2012–2016: Eastern Salon (東方沙龍)
2016–: Eastern Long Lions (東方龍獅)

Technical staff
{|class="wikitable"
|-
!Position
!Staff
|-
|Head coach||  Roberto Losada
|-
|Assistant coach||  Cristiano Cordeiro
|-
|Assistant coach||  Lo Chi Kwan
|-
|Goalkeeping coach|| Ricardo Navarro
|-
|Sport Performance||  Pau MP

Current squad

First team

 FP

 FP

 FP
 LP
 FP
 FP

 FP

Remarks:
FP These players are registered as foreign players.
LP These players are registered as local players in Hong Kong domestic football competitions.

Out on loan

Honours

League
 Hong Kong Premier League
Champions (1): 2015–16
Runners-up (3): 2014–15, 2016–17, 2019–20
 Hong Kong First Division
Champions (4): 1955–56, 1992–93, 1993–94, 1994–95
Runners-up (2): 1986–87, 1991–92
 Hong Kong Second Division
Champions (1): 1947–48
 Hong Kong Third Division
Champions (3): 2004–05, 2009–10, 2010–11, 2011–12

Cup Competitions
 Hong Kong Senior Shield
Champions (11): 1939–40, 1952–53, 1955–56, 1981–82, 1986–87, 1992–93, 1993–94, 2007–08, 2014–15, 2015–16, 2019–20
Runners-up (5):  1947–48, 1971–72, 2016–17, 2017–18, 2022–23
 Hong Kong FA Cup
Champions (5): 1983–84, 1992–93, 1993–94, 2013–14, 2019–20
Runners-up (2): 1994–95, 2014–15
Hong Kong Sapling Cup
Champions (1): 2020–21
 Hong Kong Viceroy Cup
Champions (2): 1970–72, 1980–81
Hong Kong Community Cup
 Champions (1): 2016
Runners-up (1): 2017

Season-to-season record

Note:

Continental record

Record
In 1992–93 season, Eastern maintained a record of 9 straight wins in the first half of the First Division League season. The team scored 30 goals in the first 9 matches with no goals conceded. It was a record of 3-zero (0 draw, 0 loss, 0 conceded). Eastern captured 3 trophies in that season, and regained the League Champion title after 37 years.

Head coaches
   Bobby Moore (卜比·摩亞) (1981–1982)
   Peter Wong (黃興桂)
   Tsang Wai Chung (曾偉忠)
   Casemiro Mior (米路) (2007–2008)
   Chan Hiu Ming (陳曉明), Lee Kin Wo (李健和), Lo Kai Wah (羅繼華) (2008–2009)
   Lee Kin Wo (李健和) (2009–2013)
   Cristiano Cordeiro (高尼路) (2013–2015)
   Yeung Ching Kwong (楊正光) (2015)
   Chan Yuen Ting (陳婉婷) (2015–2017)
   Szeto Man Chun (司徒文俊) (2017–2018)
   Lee Kin Wo (李健和) (caretaker) (2018)
   Chan Yuen Ting (陳婉婷) (2018–2019)
   Wong Chun Yue (黃鎮宇) (caretaker) (2019)
   Andrejs Štolcers (安祖史杜錫) (caretaker) (2019)
   Lee Chi Kin (李志堅) (2019–2021)
   Roberto Losada (盧比度) (2021–present)

References

External links
 

 
Eastern Athletic Association
Association football clubs established in 1932
1932 establishments in Hong Kong